Lake Grace South, part of the Lake Grace System, is a wetland located in the Great Southern region of Western Australia. Situated in the Shire of Kent, the lake is part of the Western Mallee subregion of the Mallee region. It is one of four lakes in the area comprising a DIWA-listed wetland of national importance.

See also

 List of lakes of Western Australia

References

Wetlands of Western Australia
DIWA-listed wetlands
Great Southern (Western Australia)